The Yakovlev Yak-18 (NATO reporting name Max) is a tandem two-seat military primary trainer aircraft manufactured in the Soviet Union. Originally powered by one 119 kW (160 hp) Shvetsov M-11FR-1 radial piston engine, it entered service in 1946. It was also produced in China as the Nanchang CJ-5.

Design and development

A member of the second generation of Russian aircraft designers, and best known for fighter designs, Alexander Sergeyevich Yakovlev always retained a light aircraft design section. In May 1945, Yakovlev initiated design of the Yak-18 two-seat primary trainer. He designed it to replace the earlier Yakovlev UT-2 and Yakovlev Yak-5 in service with the Soviet Air Forces and DOSAAF (Voluntary Society for Collaboration with the Army, Air Force and Navy, which sponsored aero clubs throughout the USSR). In 1944, an advanced version of the UT-2 had been built with many of the features of the new Yak-18. The new aircraft flew a year later, powered by a 119 kW (160 hp) Shvetsov M-11 five-cylinder radial engine and featuring pneumatically operated retractable main landing gear and a fixed tailwheel. It entered service as a trainer later that year and was built by Yakovlev up until 1956. Examples were exported to China in kit form beginning in 1950. The Chinese began producing license built copies in 1954 with the designation CJ-5.

The Yak-18's greatest claim to fame is its use as a night bomber by the North Korean Air Force during the Korean War. The aircraft were modified with bomb racks on the wing center section and flew over UN troop locations at night to drop bombs and harass UN forces. The five-cylinder engine reminded many of the US troops of the sound made by early gasoline powered washing machines, earning them the name: "Washing Machine Charlie". The name "Bed Check Charlie" was also used for these night intruders. The Yak-18s, along with Polikarpov Po-2s, became quite a nuisance until US night fighters began shooting them down. One nightfighter crashed shooting down a Bed Check Charlie and another nightfighter rammed its target.

Other claims to fame for the Yak-18 are an international speed record for its class in 1951 as well as being the aircraft used for initial flight training by Yuri Gagarin (1st human in space) and Ken Rowe (No Kum-Sok, who defected from North Korea with a Mikoyan-Gurevich MiG-15 jet fighter during the Korean War). Later, as the need for conventional landing gear trainers abated, Yakovlev re-designed the Yak-18 with retractable tricycle landing gear and an Ivchenko AI-14RF radial engine of 224 kW (300 hp); this was designated the Yak-18A. The design proved exceptionally easy to build and maintain.

There are an estimated 40 original Yak-18s in existence worldwide. Five are currently flyable in the US, three are flyable in Europe, and the Chinese Air Force has one flyable with several other airframes in storage. Approximately four other aircraft worldwide are currently being restored for flight. Many are found in major aviation museums worldwide including the National Air and Space Museum in the USA. The Nanchang CJ-6, produced in China, is sometimes quoted as a variant but is a completely different aircraft designed in China by Bushi Cheng and built by Nanchang Aircraft Company.

Operational history

The Yak-18 became the standard trainer for Air Force flying schools and DOSAAF, was in wide use in China, and in many other countries.

Photographs showing Kim Jong-Un visiting a North Korean Air Force base in March 2014 suggest that the North Koreans may still maintain original Yak-18s or CJ-5s in a bombing role.

Variants

Yak-18
The original production version. Retractable main undercarriage, fixed tailwheel.
Yak-18U
This version was built in small numbers. It had retractable tricycle landing gear.
Yak-18A
Cleaned up version of the Yak-18U, powered by a 194 kW (260 hp) Ivchenko AI-14 FR engine. Built in large numbers.
Yak-18P (NATO reporting name Mouse)
Single-seat aerobatic aircraft for use by flying clubs. Adaptation of Yak-18 two-seat trainer.
Yak-18PM
Single-seat aerobatic aircraft with retractable tricycle landing gear. 
Yak-18PS
Aerobatic aircraft with retractable main gear.
Hongzhuan-501 (Red Craftsman)
Probable original designation for early CJ-5 production aircraft.
Nanchang CJ-5
The Yak-18 was built under licence in China as the CJ-5 for use by the PLAAF, PLANAF and civilian flying clubs; 379 CJ-5s had been built when production ended in 1958.

Similar model designation
The Yakovlev Yak-18T was developed as an Aeroflot training aircraft and also as a light passenger transport aircraft, with a cabin for one pilot and three passengers. It is not a variant of the Yak-18 as it has very little in common, and was designed from scratch 20 years later.

Operators

 Afghanistan
 Afghan Air Force 
 Albania
 Albanian Air Force (including Chinese CJ-6 variants).
 Algeria
 Algerian Air Force
 Armenia
 Armenian Air Force
 Austria
 Austrian Air Force
 Bulgaria
 Bulgarian Air Force
 Cambodia
 Royal Cambodian Air Force
 Khmer Air Force
 China
 People's Liberation Army Air Force - manufactured in China under the designation CJ-5.
 Czechoslovakia
 Czechoslovakian Air Force
 Czechoslovakian National Security Guard
 East Germany
 Air Forces of the National People's Army
 Egypt
 Egyptian Air Force
 Guinea
 Military of Guinea
 Hungary
 Hungarian Air Force
 Iraq
 Iraqi Air Force
 Laos
 Lao People's Liberation Army Air Force
 Mali
 Air Force of Mali
 Mongolia
 Mongolian People's Air Force
 North Korea
 North Korean Air Force
 Poland
 Polish Air Force
 Romania
 Romanian Air Force
 Somalia
 Somali Air Corps
 Soviet Union
 DOSAAF
 Soviet Air Force
 Syria
 Syrian Air Force
 Transnistria
 Military of Transnistria - 2
 Turkmenistan
 Turkmenistan Air Force
 Vietnam
 Vietnam People's Air Force
 Yemen
 Yemen Air Force
 Zambia
 Zambian Air Force

Specifications (Yak-18A)

See also

References

External links

 Description page on aviation.ru

Low-wing aircraft
1940s Soviet military trainer aircraft
1940s Soviet civil trainer aircraft
Yak-018
Aerobatic aircraft
Single-engined tractor aircraft
Aircraft first flown in 1946